A Medio Vivir is the third studio album by the Puerto Rican singer Ricky Martin, released by Sony Discos and Columbia on September 12, 1995 (US).

Commercial performance
The album has sold over three million copies, worldwide. That number includes 1.3 million copies sold in Europe.

A Medio Vivir was released at first in Latin America in 1995. It peaked at number eleven on the Top Latin Albums in the US. Five songs from this album charted on the Hot Latin Songs, including "María" and "Volverás", which both peaked at number six, "Te Extraño, Te Olvido, Te Amo" which reached number nine, "Nada es Imposible" (number twenty-three) and "A Medio Vivir" (number thirty-six). The album was certified 6× Platinum in Argentina.

In 1996, "María" debuted on the Billboard Hot 100 in the United States, and peaked at number eighty-eight. The album has sold 287,000 copies in the US and was certified Gold by the RIAA for shipping 500,000 copies. The same year, "María" charted in Spain and Finland, and A Medio Vivir followed peaking inside top ten in both countries. It was certified 4× Platinum in Spain and Gold in Finland.

However, the real international breakthrough came in 1997, when "María" became a hit all over Europe. A Medio Vivir debuted on the charts in various countries, peaking inside top ten in France and Belgium Wallonia. It was certified Platinum by the IFPI, after selling one million copies in Europe. It was certified Platinum in France and Belgium and Gold in Switzerland.

After the success of "María", "Te Extraño, Te Olvido, Te Amo" was released as the second international single. It peaked inside top ten in France and Belgium Wallonia. "Volverás" was released as the third single and peaked at number forty-eight in France. "Corazón" was released in Finland reaching number twenty.

Track listing

Charts

Weekly charts

Year-end charts

Certifications and sales

Release history

The European Tour DVD

Europa: European Tour is a DVD release by Ricky Martin recorded during his sold-out tour in Europe in 1997 while promoting A Medio Vivir.

Track listing

See also
1995 in Latin music
List of best-selling albums in Argentina
List of best-selling Latin albums

References

1995 albums
Ricky Martin albums
Spanish-language albums
Albums produced by K. C. Porter
Sony Discos albums
Columbia Records albums